Rhizopus circinans is a plant pathogen infecting almond, apricot and peach.

References

External links 
 Index Fungorum
 USDA ARS Fungal Database

Fungal plant pathogens and diseases
Stone fruit tree diseases
Mucoraceae